WLLE (102.1 FM) is a radio station broadcasting a classic country format. Licensed to Mayfield, Kentucky, United States, the station serves the Paducah area.  The station is currently owned by Bristol Broadcasting Company, Inc.

History
The station was assigned call sign WCBF on April 18, 1997.  On May 1, 2002, the station changed its call sign to WYKL; it became WKBG on May 12, 2003, and WLLE on June 14, 2004.

References

External links

LLE
Classic country radio stations in the United States